Karl Olsen (27 December 1910 – 21 February 1999) was a Norwegian civil servant.

Early life
He was born in Farsund, and graduated as siv.ing. from the Norwegian Institute of Technology.

Career
From 1962 to 1980 he served as director of the Norwegian Directorate of Public Roads. Before this he worked in the administration of Bærum municipality. From 1952 to 1956 he was president of the Norwegian Association of Civil Engineers, an organization now known as Tekna.

Private life
He resided at Høvik. He died in February 1999 in Bærum.

References

1910 births
1999 deaths
People from Farsund
Norwegian Institute of Technology alumni
20th-century Norwegian engineers
Norwegian civil servants
Directors of government agencies of Norway
People from Bærum
Directorate of Public Roads people